The Laurier Railway Bridge (often referred to as Pierre Le Gardeur railway bridge, after the road bridge next to it) carries the Canadian National Railway from Montreal (Rivière-des-Prairies–Pointe-aux-Trembles) to Charlemagne (North Shore) via Île Bourdon.

See also 
 List of bridges in Canada
 List of bridges spanning the Rivière des Prairies
 List of crossings of the Rivière des Prairies
 List of bridges in Montreal

References 

Bridges in Montreal
Buildings and structures in Lanaudière
Railway bridges in Quebec
Rivière des Prairies
Rivière-des-Prairies–Pointe-aux-Trembles
Transport in Repentigny, Quebec
Truss bridges in Canada